The Aeros Cross Country, sometimes called the Aeros Cross-Country, is a Ukrainian ultralight trike, designed and produced by Aeros of Kyiv. The aircraft is supplied as a complete ready-to-fly aircraft or as kit for amateur construction.

Design and development
Intended as a more basic model than the Aeros-2 for off-airport use, the Cross Country features a cable-braced hang glider-style high-wing, weight-shift controls, a two-seats-in-tandem open cockpit, tricycle landing gear and a single engine in pusher configuration.

The aircraft is made from tubing, with its wing covered in Dacron sailcloth. Its  span wing is supported by a single tube-type kingpost and uses an "A" frame control bar. Unlike the Aeros-2 the Cross Country does not have a cockpit fairing and sports heavy duty main wheel suspension for rough fields.

Engines available include the twin cylinder, two-stroke, air-cooled  Rotax 503, the liquid-cooled  Rotax 582, the four cylinder four-stroke  Rotax 912UL and  912ULS or the certified 912A or S. The BMW K-1100 ULS powerplant is also optional. Available wings to be mated to the carriage are the Aeros Profi, Aeros Stranger, Aeros Stream and Aeros Still.

An aerial application kit to allow crop spraying was available as an option.

Specifications (Cross Country 912)

References

External links

1990s Ukrainian ultralight aircraft
Homebuilt aircraft
Single-engined pusher aircraft
Ultralight trikes
Cross Country